The North American Brass Band Association (NABBA) is among the organizations whose goal is to promote the British brass band in North America.

Publication 
The Brass Band Bridge is the official publication of the North American Brass Band Association (NABBA). The first issue was in 1980, and since then it has been roughly a quarterly publication.

Annual competition 
Each year in late winter or early spring, a competition is held for brass bands across North America to compete. Four sections, or difficulty levels, exist for adults: 3rd Section, 2nd Section, 1st Section, and Championship Section. A Youth Section also exists and is restricted to performers ages 17 and younger who are enrolled in a primary or secondary school.

Despite the association's name, occasionally a visiting band from overseas will compete, such as the Stavanger Brass Band, from Norway, who won the Championship Section in 2003 and 2014.

Host cities, section winners, test pieces (composers)

Solo competition 
As part of the annual competition, 11 different categories of solo contests are also held:

  Adult High Brass Slow Melody – Any Age (Cornets, Flugelhorns & Tenor Horns only)
  Adult High Brass Technical Work – Any Age (Cornets, Flugelhorns & Tenor Horns only)
  Adult Low Brass Slow Melody – Any Age (Baritones, Trombones, Euphoniums & Tubas only)
  Adult Low Brass Technical Work – Any Age (Baritones, Trombones, Euphoniums & Tubas only)
  Adult High Brass Slow Melody ‐ Senior (Cornets, Flugelhorns & Tenor Horns only)
  Adult High Brass Technical Work – Senior (Cornets, Flugelhorns & Tenor Horns only)
  Adult Low Brass Slow Melody – Senior (Baritones, Trombones, Euphoniums & Tubas only)
  Adult Low Brass Technical Work – Senior (Baritones, Trombones, Euphoniums & Tubas only)
  Youth Brass Solo – must be 17 years of age or younger or enrolled in a primary or secondary school.   
  Adult Percussion Solo   
  Youth Percussion Solo – must be 17 years of age or younger or enrolled in a primary or secondary school.

Although each section is individually scored and winners are announced accordingly, the overall Best Soloist each year typically wins a brand new instrument donated by its manufacturer.

Member bands  
A list of the member bands as of 2022:

See also 

 Great American Brass Band Festival

References

External links 
 Official site

Brass bands
Brass instrument organizations